The Starlighter is a studio album from American folk musician Shawn Colvin, released in 2018 to positive critical reception.

Reception
In Relix, Lee Zimmerman called Colvin a "superb interpreter of outside material" and considers this album "a nice listen" for children and adults. The editorial staff of AllMusic Guide gave this album scored The Starlighter 3.5 out of five stars, with reviewer Stephen Thomas Erlewine noting the care that Colvin took in choosing from the Lullabies and Night Songs songbook, orchestrating the music, and ultimately coming up with a recording that is "a cozy, comforting place between attentive and background listening", which is ideal for lullabies. For PopMatters, Will Layman rated this album a seven out of 10, praising the diversity of instrumentation and arrangements by Doug Petty.

Track listing
"The Starlighter" (lyrics: Arthur Guiterman, music: Doug Petty and Alec Wilder) – 3:06
"Raisins and Almonds" (traditional, music by Doug Petty) – 3:07
"Go Tell Aunt Rhody" (traditional, music by Doug Petty) – 3:09
"Minnie and Winnie" (lyrics: Alfred Lord Tennyson, music by Doug Petty and Alec Wilder) – 3:23
"Sleep Baby Sleep" (traditional) – 2:02
"Many Million Years Ago" (lyrics: William Engvick, music: Doug Petty and Alec Wilder) – 3:57
"The Huntsman" (lyrics: Walter de la Mare, music: Alec Wilder) – 3:06
"The Cuckoo" (lyrics: traditional, music: Shawn Colvin, Doug Petty, and Alec Wilder) – 1:51
"Night" (lyrics: Lois W. McKay, music: Doug Petty and Alec Wilder) – 3:00
"The Journey" (lyrics: William Engvick, music: Doug Petty and Alec Wilder) – 2:53
"Bobby Shaftoe" (traditional) – 1:53
"The Nut Tree" (traditional) – 2:37
"Hush Little Baby" (lyrics: traditional, music: Shawn Colvin, Doug Petty, and Alec Wilder) – 3:08
"Cradle Song" (lyrics: William Blake, music: Shawn Colvin, Doug Petty, and Alec Wilder) – 1:53

Personnel
Shawn Colvin – arrangement on "The Cuckoo", "Hush Little Baby", and "Cradle Song"; acoustic guitar; vocals
Carlos Castro – engineering, mixing
Joseph Holquin – assistant engineering
Martin Hughes – artwork
Tim Lefebvre – bass guitar
Dan Petty – guitar
Doug Petty – production; arrangement on "The Starlighter", "Raisins and Almonds", "Go Tell Aunt Rhody", "Minnie and Winnie", "Many Million Years Ago", "The Huntsman", "The Cuckoo", "Hush Little Baby", and "Cradle Song"; Hammond organ, piano
Scott Sedillo – mastering
Jacob Sciba – assistant engineering
Aaron Sterling – drums, percussion
Mick Taras – guitar
Alec Wilder – arrangement on "Raisins and Almonds", "Go Tell Aunt Rhody", "Sleep Baby Sleep", "Night", "The Journey", "Bobby Shaftoe", "The Nut Tree", and "Hush Little Baby"

See also
List of 2018 albums

References

External links

2018 albums
Shawn Colvin albums
Children's music albums by American artists
Covers albums